Seyyed Gatush (also Romanized as Seyyed Gatūsh) is a village in Howmeh-ye Sharqi Rural District, in the Central District of Ramhormoz County, Khuzestan Province, Iran. At the 2006 census, its population was 25, in seven families.

References 

Populated places in Ramhormoz County